The men's 100 metre butterfly event at the 2009 World Aquatics Championships took place between 31 July – 1 August at the Foro Italico. Both the heats and semifinals were held on 31 July with the heats being held in the morning session and the semifinals being held in the evening session. The final was held on 1 August.

Records
Prior to this competition, the existing world and competition records were as follows:

The following records were established during the competition:

Results

Heats

Semifinals

Final

References
Worlds 2009 results: Men's 100m butterfly Heats, from OmegaTiming.com (official timer of the 2009 Worlds); retrieved 2009-08-06.
Worlds 2009 results: Men's 100m butterfly  Semifinals, from OmegaTiming.com (official timer of the 2009 Worlds); retrieved 2009-08-06.
Worlds 2009 results: Men's 100m butterfly  Finals, from OmegaTiming.com (official timer of the 2009 Worlds); retrieved 2009-08-06.

Butterfly Men 100